100th Regiment or 100th Infantry Regiment may refer to:

 100th Regiment of Foot (disambiguation), several units of the British Army
100th Anti-Tank Regiment, Royal Artillery (The Gordon Highlanders)
100th Heavy Anti-Aircraft Regiment, Royal Artillery
100th Guards Fighter Aviation Regiment
100th Independent Shipborne Fighter Aviation Regiment

Union Army (American Civil War):
 100th Illinois Infantry Regiment
 100th Indiana Infantry Regiment
 100th New York Volunteer Infantry
 100th Ohio Infantry
 100th Pennsylvania Infantry Regiment